Mercer County is a county in the U.S. state of North Dakota. As of the 2020 census, the population was 8,350. Its county seat is Stanton.

History
The Dakota Territory legislature enacted an January 8, 1873 law to create a county named Mercer, whose boundaries would be identical to Pratt (a now-extinct county). This county did not come into existence, as the 1873 act was nullified on January 14, 1875, by the legislature. On that date the legislature created another Mercer County, from previously unorganized territory. The county was named for William Henry Harrison Mercer, (1844–1901), a rancher who settled north of Bismarck in 1869. The unorganized county was not attached to another county for judicial or administrative purposes; this condition continued until November 6, 1883, when the county government was organized.

The county boundaries were altered in 1879, 1881, 1885, 1892, and 1901. Its boundaries have remained unchanged since 1901.

Geography
The northern boundary of Mercer County is delineated by Lake Sakakawea, created in 1956 on the Missouri River. The county's eastern boundary is delineated by the river as it flows southeastward from the dam that created the lake. The county terrain consists of rolling hills, largely devoted to agriculture. The terrain slopes to the north and east; its highest point is near the midpoint of its southern boundary, at 2,451' (747m) ASL.

The southwestern corner counties of North Dakota (Adams, Billings, Bowman, Golden Valley, Grant, Hettinger, Slope, Stark) observe Mountain Time. The counties of McKenzie, Dunn, and Sioux counties are split, with their northern portions observing Central Time and the southern portions observing Mountain Time.

Prior to  November 7, 2010, the western portion of Mercer County was in Mountain Time.   But it was all moved into the Central Time on that date.

Major highways

  North Dakota Highway 31
  North Dakota Highway 48
  North Dakota Highway 49
  North Dakota Highway 200
  North Dakota Highway 1806

Adjacent counties

 McLean County - north
 Oliver County - east
 Morton County - south
 Stark County - southwest (observes Mountain Time)

Protected areas

 Beaver Creek State Game Management Area
 Hazen Bay Recreation Area
 Knife River Indian Villages National Historic Site
 Lake Sakakawea State Park

Lake
 Lake Sakakawea

Demographics

2000 census
As of the 2000 census, there were 8,644 people, 3,346 households, and 2,445 families in the county. The population density was 8.29/sqmi (3.20/km2). There were 4,402 housing units at an average density of 4.22/sqmi (1.63/km2). The racial makeup of the county was 96.04% White, 0.05% Black or African American, 2.00% Native American, 0.25% Asian, 0.38% Pacific Islander, 0.12% from other races, and 1.16% from two or more races. 0.37% of the population were Hispanic or Latino of any race. 68.8% were of German and 8.2% Norwegian ancestry.

There were 3,346 households, out of which 37.10% had children under the age of 18 living with them, 65.20% were married couples living together, 5.10% had a female householder with no husband present, and 26.90% were non-families. 24.80% of all households were made up of individuals, and 11.10% had someone living alone who was 65 years of age or older. The average household size was 2.55 and the average family size was 3.05.

The county population contained 29.10% under the age of 18, 4.20% from 18 to 24, 27.50% from 25 to 44, 24.90% from 45 to 64, and 14.30% who were 65 years of age or older. The median age was 40 years. For every 100 females there were 101.20 males. For every 100 females age 18 and over, there were 99.90 males.

The median income for a household in the county was $42,269, and the median income for a family was $51,983. Males had a median income of $47,969 versus $21,667 for females. The per capita income for the county was $18,256. About 5.50% of families and 7.50% of the population were below the poverty line, including 5.20% of those under age 18 and 20.90% of those age 65 or over.

2010 census
As of the 2010 census, there were 8,424 people, 3,625 households, and 2,500 families in the county. The population density was 8.08/sqmi (3.12/km2). There were 4,450 housing units at an average density of 4.27/sqmi (1.65/km2). The racial makeup of the county was 95.6% white, 2.3% American Indian, 0.3% Asian, 0.2% black or African American, 0.1% Pacific islander, 0.4% from other races, and 1.1% from two or more races. Those of Hispanic or Latino origin made up 1.4% of the population. In terms of ancestry, 64.7% were German, 21.5% were Norwegian, 6.6% were Russian, 6.2% were Irish, and 2.2% were American.

Of the 3,625 households, 26.5% had children under the age of 18 living with them, 60.1% were married couples living together, 5.0% had a female householder with no husband present, 31.0% were non-families, and 27.3% of all households were made up of individuals. The average household size was 2.29 and the average family size was 2.76. The median age was 46.3 years.

The median income for a household in the county was $60,191 and the median income for a family was $71,075. Males had a median income of $63,321 versus $32,294 for females. The per capita income for the county was $30,616. About 4.1% of families and 6.2% of the population were below the poverty line, including 7.2% of those under age 18 and 11.2% of those age 65 or over.

Communities

Cities 

 Beulah
 Golden Valley
 Hazen
 Pick City
 Stanton (county seat)
 Zap

Politics
Mercer County voters have traditionally voted Republican. In no national election since 1936 has the county selected the Democratic Party candidate (as of 2020).

Education
School districts include:

 Beulah Public School District 27
 Center-Stanton Public School District 1
 Glen Ullin Public School District 48
 Halliday Public School District 19
 Hazen Public School District 3
 Hebron Public School District 13
 Underwood Public School District 8

Elementary:
 Twin Buttes Public School District 37

Stanton previously had a separate school district, but it merged with Center's in 2004.

See also
 National Register of Historic Places listings in Mercer County, North Dakota

References

External links
 Mercer County maps, Sheet 1 (northern) and Sheet 2 (southern), North Dakota DOT

 
North Dakota counties on the Missouri River
1884 establishments in Dakota Territory
Populated places established in 1884